The 1964 Armstrong 500 was a production car race held on 4 October 1964 at the Mount Panorama Circuit just outside Bathurst in New South Wales, Australia. The 500 mile race was open to Australian built production sedans of which 100 examples had been registered. It was the fifth Armstrong 500 and the second to be held at Bathurst although it is commonly referred to as the fifth "Bathurst 500".

Official results reflected only class placings, with no outright winner recognized by the organizing body, the Australian Racing Drivers’ Club. The first car to complete the full 130 lap distance race was a factory backed Ford Cortina GT driven by Bob Jane and George Reynolds, the 1964 event being the fourth consecutive Armstrong 500 in which Jane had achieved an unofficial "line honours" victory.

Class structure
Cars competed in four classes based on the purchase price of the vehicle in Australian pounds. There was little change from the 1963 race. Class A entries proliferated, taking up space on the grid from a shrinking Class B. Ford Australia had a strong presence in Class C with three factory entered Cortina GTs.

Class A
The up to £900 class was composed of Hillman Imp, Morris 850, NSU Prinz, Vauxhall Viva and Volkswagen Beetle.

Class B
The £901 to £1,000 class featured Ford Cortina 1500, Morris Cooper, Renault R8 and Simca Aronde.

Class C
The £1,001 to £1,200 class included only Ford Cortina GT and Holden EH entries.

Class D
The £1,201 to £2,000 class featured Chrysler Valiant, Citroën ID19, Ford Zephyr, Humber Vogue Sports, Holden EH Premier, Studebaker Lark, Triumph 2000 and Vauxhall Velox.

Race
While the V8 powered Studebaker Larks again led early, fragile brakes saw them overtaken by the leading Cortinas as the race wore on. The Cortina driven by the Geoghegan brothers fell from the mid-race lead after a generator bracket broke, allowing teammates Jane and Reynolds into the race lead they would not relinquish. Barry Seton and Herb Taylor finished second ahead of Jane's former partner Harry Firth co-driving the third factory Ford with John Reaburn. In the other three classes, the early leaders each retained their leads throughout the day. Bert Needham and Warren Weldon brought their Class D winning Studebaker home as fourth car across the line, two laps down on Jane/Reynolds and a lap behind Firth/Reaburn. Charlie Smith and Bruce Maher won Class B, leading home a 1-2-3-4 for Morris Cooper ahead of four Renault R8s. Smith/Maher finished just six laps behind the Cortina GTs. Class A was dominated by Vauxhall, with the Viva of Spencer Martin and Bill Brown leading home five other examples. Seven cars failed to finish the event, with another being disqualified.

Results
As follows:

The Team Prize was won by the three Ford Motor Co. entered Ford Cortina GTs driven by Jane/Reynolds, Seton/Taylor and Firth/Raeburn.

Statistics
 Fastest Lap - #21 Geoghegan/Geoghegan - 3:21.3
 Fastest "flying eighth mile" speed was achieved by the Studebaker Lark of Warren Weldon & Bert Needham at 114.65 mph
 Race Time - No time published by the ARDC

References

External links
 Race results from www.uniquecarsandparts.com.au
 Autopics Bathurst images
 Race images from www.motorsportarchive.com

Motorsport in Bathurst, New South Wales
Armstrong 500
Armstrong 500